In mathematics, the Grace–Walsh–Szegő coincidence theorem is a result named after John Hilton Grace, Joseph L. Walsh, and Gábor Szegő.

Statement 

Suppose ƒ(z1, ..., zn) is a polynomial with complex coefficients, and that it is
 symmetric, i.e. invariant under permutations of the variables, and
 multi-affine, i.e. affine in each variable separately.
Let A be a circular region in the complex plane.  If either A is convex or the degree of ƒ is n, then for every  there exists  such that

Notes and references 

Theorems in complex analysis
Theorems about polynomials